The ARIA Singles Chart ranks the best-performing singles in Australia. Its data, published by the Australian Recording Industry Association, is based collectively on each single's weekly physical and digital sales. In 2015, nineteen singles claimed the top spot, including Mark Ronson's "Uptown Funk", which started its peak position in 2014, and 23 acts achieved their first number-one single in Australia: Ronson, OMI, Felix Jaehn, Ellie Goulding, LunchMoney Lewis, Major Lazer, DJ Snake, MØ, Wiz Khalifa, Charlie Puth, Grace, G-Eazy, Kendrick Lamar, Conrad Sewell, Lost Frequencies, One Direction, Calvin Harris, Disciples, Justin Bieber, Eric Nally, Melle Mel, Kool Moe Dee and Grandmaster Caz. 

Justin Bieber achieved two number-ones: "What Do You Mean?" (4 weeks) and "Love Yourself" (3 weeks), making him the longest-topping artist of 2015. For spending six consecutive weeks each at number-one, the longest-running number-one singles of the year were Wiz Khalifa and Charlie Puth's "See You Again" and Adele's "Hello". Ellie Goulding's "Love Me Like You Do", Meghan Trainor and John Legend's "Like I'm Gonna Lose You", Justin Bieber's "What Do You Mean?", and Macklemore & Ryan Lewis' "Downtown" shared the title of second longest-running number-one single of 2015, each spending four weeks on the top. Taylor Swift's "Bad Blood" featuring Kendrick Lamar topped the charts for three consecutive weeks, making it Lamar's first single to top the chart.

Chart history

Number-one artists

See also
2015 in music
List of number-one albums of 2015 (Australia)
List of Top 25 singles for 2015 in Australia
List of top 10 singles in 2015 (Australia)

References

Australia Singles
Number-one singles
2015